Crawler (stylised in all caps) is the fourth album by British rock band Idles, released on 12 November 2021.

Crawler received favourable reviews and was nominated for Best Rock Album at the 65th Annual Grammy Awards.

Promotion

Singles
The first single, "The Beachland Ballroom", was released on 28 September 2021 along with the announcement of the album. Prior to the album's release, the second single, for "Car Crash" was released. The song was about Talbot's terrifying car accident in the past.

Music videos
After the release of the album, Idles released two music videos from Crawler. The first, "When the Lights Come On" premiered on 13 December 2021 with direction from the company, Holding Hands with Horses. On 8 February 2022, the music video for "Crawl!" was released. The video was a claymation video directed by LOOSE and Edie Lawrence.

Artwork and title 
The album cover features a contemporary home, with a man in a helmet and protective pads levitating in front of the home. The artwork for the album was a collaborative effort between lead vocalist Joe Talbot and photographer Tom Ham.

Music and composition 
Crawler has been described by critics as primarily a hardcore punk, noise rock, and post-punk record, with elements of powerviolence and grindcore throughout the album.

Critical reception

Crawler was met with "universal acclaim" reviews from critics. At Metacritic, which assigns a weighted average rating out of 100 to reviews from mainstream publications, this release received an average score of 82 based on 18 reviews. Aggregator AnyDecentMusic? gave the release a 7.7 out of 10 based on a critical consensus of 18 reviews.

Track listing

Personnel
Idles
 Joe Talbot – lead vocals, design
 Adam Devonshire – bass guitar
 Mark Bowen – guitar, keyboards, production, engineering
 Lee Kiernan – guitar
 Jon Beavis – drums

Additional personnel
 Kenny Beats – production, engineering
 Joe LaPorta – mastering
 Craig Silvey – mixing
 Chris Fullard – engineering
 Charlotte Nicholls – cello
 Colin Webster – saxophone
 Dane Cross – additional vocals
 Dani Bennett-Spragg – mixing assistance
 Oli Middleton – engineering assistance
 Stan Gravett – engineering assistance
 Tom Ham – photography
 Mishi May – costume design

Charts

References

2021 albums
Idles (band) albums
Partisan Records albums